The Salome Wilderness of Tonto National Forest is a protected area in the rim country of the southwestern US.  The Salome Wilderness lies within the Sierra Ancha mountain range in Gila County, Arizona.

Ecology
Prominent perennial streams within this wilderness area are Workman Creek and Salome Creek. The region has a diverse flora and fauna. Within this part of the Sierra Ancha Range there are notable disjunctive populations of Coastal woodfern, Dryopteris arguta; this fern is otherwise common in areas nearer the Pacific coast.

References

 Tom Dollar and Jerry Sieve. 1999. Guide to Arizona's Wilderness Areas, Big Earth Publishing, 304 pages
 C. Michael Hogan. 2008. Coastal Woodfern (Dryopteris arguta), GlobalTwitcher, ed. N. Stromberg
 

Protected areas of Gila County, Arizona
IUCN Category Ib
Wilderness areas of Arizona
Tonto National Forest